Geumcheon-gu Office Station, formerly known as Siheung Station, is a station on the Line 1 of the Seoul Subway, as well as the Gyeongbu Line. Commuter rail trains on Line 1 travel southwards from here to Anyang, Suwon, Pyeongtaek and Cheonan Stations via the Gyeongbu Line.

In addition, a spur line (also a part of Line 1) between this station and Gwangmyeong Station on the KTX serves to link high-speed trains and commuter rail.

The name of the station was changed from Siheung to its current name on December 29, 2008. The main reason for the change was because of the confusion with Siheung, a city located southwest of here.

Gallery

References

Seoul Metropolitan Subway stations
Metro stations in Geumcheon District
Railway stations opened in 1908
1908 establishments in Korea